Chris Langley (born 11 September 1980) is an English former professional rugby league footballer who played as a . He played for the Huddersfield Giants in the Super League, and also had spells with the Featherstone Rovers, the York City Knights, the Batley Bulldogs and the Dewsbury Rams.

He made 34 appearances for the York City Knights in 2004.

References

External links
Dewsbury Rams
Statistics at rugbyleagueproject.org

1980 births
Living people
Batley Bulldogs players
Dewsbury Rams players
English rugby league players
Featherstone Rovers players
Huddersfield Giants players
Rugby league centres
Rugby league wingers
York City Knights players